Quarter glass (or quarter light) on automobiles and closed carriages may be a side window in the front door or located on each side of the car just forward of the rear-facing rear window of the vehicle. Only some cars have them. In some cases, the fixed quarter glass may set in the corner or "C-pillar" of the vehicle. Quarter glass is also sometimes called a valence window.(AKA quarter lite)

This window may be set on hinges and is then also known as a vent window, wing window, wing vent window, or a fly window.  Most often found on older vehicles on the front doors, it is a small roughly triangular glass in front of and separate from the main window that rotates inward (see top right image) for ventilation.

Designs
Many early closed cars, such as the 1933 Pontiac Economy Eight had front and rear vent windows called "ventiplanes" and were installed on all GM products that year. It has hinges and a latch, so it can be opened for additional ventilation. 1933 was the first year all GM vehicles were installed with optional vent windows which were initially called "No Draft Individually Controlled Ventilation" later renamed "Ventiplanes" which the patent application was filed on 28 Nov. 1932. It was assigned to the Ternstedt Manufacturing Company, a GM subsidiary that manufactured components for Fisher Body.

Most vehicles since the 1960s have removed this feature for cleaner styling known as "ventless" windows. Some automakers continued to offer vent windows with the American Motors made AMC Pacer having optional front vent windows for increased flow-through ventilation. Although the front venting windows "provide unmatched ventilation, air turbulence and leakage outweigh the benefits". As automobile air conditioning became more popular, front window vents disappeared by the 1980s.

Some vehicles also have glass that rolls down like a regular window or have hinged opening vent quarter windows for rear seat passengers. During the 1980s, the Lincoln Town Car had a version where the vent window would retract into the door separately from the primary side window, so that the vent window would always drop down first and was the last to return after the main window was rolled back up. The Toyota Century had vent windows that would pivot out, and were operated with a dedicated electric switch for the front and a separate vent window in the rear doors. This may be a side window between the B-pillar and the C-pillar, and in the case of US minivans between the C and D-pillars (examples include the Chrysler Town and Country power-operated venting glass).

A quarter glass can be found set in the body or A-pillar ahead of the front door opening (examples include the Buick Encore, Chevrolet Lumina APV, Toyota Prius, Opel Astra J, Mitsubishi Endeavor, Fiat Grande Punto, Suzuki SX4 sedan, and the 8th-generation Honda Civic sedan). They are non-movable and mounted in the door itself because that section of the rear side glass would not be able to slide down because of the cut-out in the rear doors required to clear the rear wheel housings. The fixed portion of the glass is separated from the main window that rolls down by a slim opaque vertical bar (see top left image of a close-up of rear door).

In some automobiles the fixed quarter glass may set in the corner or "C-pillar" of the vehicle. There are also designs that incorporate two quarter windows (see bottom left image) one that is part of the door and the second mounted in the roof pillar. This arrangement may help to increase driver visibility. In this case, the quarter glass in the C-pillar would not be called an "opera window". Non-opening, fixed quarter windows are installed like windshields in that they are bonded to the body with urethane.

See also
 Opera window

References

Automotive styling features
Car windows